Anna Alfredovna Starobinets (Russian:Анна Старобинец, born 1978) is a Russian writer and scriptwriter who has been called the "Russian Queen of Horror". She has published novels, short stories and children's books, and describes herself as writing "horror and supernatural fiction for adults, and also fairy and detective stories for children".

Personal life
Starobinets was born in Moscow in 1978. Her husband, writer , died in 2017, after which she had "writer's block" for 18 months. She has two children, and a poodle.

She has said that her favourite book is Neil Gaiman's American Gods.

Writing

Starobinets' first published work, the short story collection An Awkward Age (2010), was a finalist in the Russian National Bestseller Prize. It comprises "chilling short stories set in the streets of Moscow and various creepy parallel worlds", and has been translated into seven languages. It has been described as "one of the most stunning debuts to come out of Russia since Victor Pelevin: hip, funny, angry, and dark as hell" and as "an insightful take on the contemporary condition of man—in Russia and further afield".

Catlantis (2015) was her first children's book to be translated into English, and was listed in The Telegraph's 2015 "Best Christmas books for children" and described by The Guardian as "a madcap and highly original adventure". It was translated by Jane Bugaeva, who also translated In the Wolf's Lair.

Starobinets describes Look At Him (2017) as an "autobiographical non-fiction novel about the loss of an unborn baby in Russia". She has written a four-book children's series The Beastly Crimes books, which have been published in English as In the Wolf's Lair (2018), A Predator's Rights (2019), Claws of Rage (2019) and The Plucker (2019).

Selected publications (translated into English)

References

External links

Full text of story "I'm Waiting" from An Awkward Age with interview

1978 births
Living people
21st-century Russian women writers
21st-century Russian novelists
21st-century Russian short story writers
Russian horror writers
Russian children's writers
Russian women children's writers